The Ford–Fulkerson method or Ford–Fulkerson algorithm (FFA) is a greedy algorithm that computes the maximum flow in a flow network. It is sometimes called a "method" instead of an "algorithm" as the approach to finding augmenting paths in a residual graph is not fully specified or it is specified in several implementations with different running times. It was published in 1956 by L. R. Ford Jr. and D. R. Fulkerson. The name "Ford–Fulkerson" is often also used for the Edmonds–Karp algorithm, which is a fully defined implementation of the Ford–Fulkerson method.

The idea behind the algorithm is as follows: as long as there is a path from the source (start node) to the sink (end node), with available capacity on all edges in the path, we send flow along one of the paths. Then we find another path, and so on. A path with available capacity is called an augmenting path.

Algorithm
We want to find the maximum flow from the source  to the sink . After every step in the algorithm the following is maintained:

{| class="wikitable"
!  | Capacity constraints
|  || The flow along an edge cannot exceed its capacity.
|-
!  | Skew symmetry
|-
!  | Flow conservation 
|  || The net flow to a node is zero, except for the source, which "produces" flow, and the sink, which "consumes" flow.
|-
!  | Value(f)
|-
|}

This means that the flow through the network is a legal flow after each round in the algorithm. We define the residual network  to be the network with capacity  and no flow.
network, though disallowed in the original network: if  and  then .

Inputs  Given a Network  with flow capacity , a source node , and a sink node 
  for all edges 
 Find 
 For each edge 
  (Send flow along the path)
  (The flow might be "returned" later)

If you use the former, the algorithm is called Edmonds–Karp.

When no more paths in step 2 can be found,  will not be able to reach  in the residual
network.
and on the other hand serves as an upper bound for all such flows.
This proves that the flow we found is maximal. See also Max-flow Min-cut theorem.

If the graph  has multiple sources and sinks, we act as follows:
Then apply the Ford–Fulkerson algorithm.

Also, if a node  has capacity constraint , we replace this node with two nodes , and an edge , with capacity . Then apply the Ford–Fulkerson algorithm.

Complexity
By adding the flow augmenting path to the flow already established in the graph, the maximum flow will be reached when no more flow augmenting paths can be found in the graph. However, there is no certainty that this situation will ever be reached, so the best that can be guaranteed is that the answer will be correct if the algorithm terminates. In the case that the algorithm runs forever, the flow might not even converge towards the maximum flow. However, this situation only occurs with irrational flow values. This is because each augmenting path can be found in  time and increases the flow by an integer amount of at least , with the upper bound .

A variation of the Ford–Fulkerson algorithm with guaranteed termination and a runtime independent of the maximum flow value is the Edmonds–Karp algorithm, which runs in  time.

Integral example

The following example shows the first steps of Ford–Fulkerson in a flow network with 4 nodes, source  and sink . This example shows the worst-case behaviour of the algorithm. If breadth-first-search were used instead, only two steps would be needed.

Non-terminating example

The constant  was chosen so, that .

However, note that there is a flow of value , by sending  units of flow along , 1 unit of flow along , and  units of flow along . Therefore, the algorithm never terminates and the flow does not even converge to the maximum flow.

Python implementation of Edmonds–Karp algorithm
  
import collections

class Graph:
    """
    This class represents a directed graph using
    adjacency matrix representation.
    """

    def __init__(self, graph):
        self.graph = graph  # residual graph
        self.row = len(graph)

    def bfs(self, s, t, parent):
        """
        Returns true if there is a path from
        source 's' to sink 't' in residual graph.
        Also fills parent[] to store the path.
        """

        # Mark all the vertices as not visited
        visited = [False] * self.row

        # Create a queue for BFS
        queue = collections.deque()

        # Mark the source node as visited and enqueue it
        queue.append(s)
        visited[s] = True

        # Standard BFS loop
        while queue:
            u = queue.popleft()

            # Get all adjacent vertices of the dequeued vertex u
            # If an adjacent has not been visited, then mark it
            # visited and enqueue it
            for ind, val in enumerate(self.graph[u]):
                if (visited[ind] == False) and (val > 0):
                    queue.append(ind)
                    visited[ind] = True
                    parent[ind] = u

        # If we reached sink in BFS starting from source, then return
        # true, else false
        return visited[t]

    # Returns the maximum flow from s to t in the given graph
    def edmonds_karp(self, source, sink):
        # This array is filled by BFS and to store path
        parent = [-1] * self.row

        max_flow = 0  # There is no flow initially

        # Augment the flow while there is path from source to sink
        while self.bfs(source, sink, parent):
            # Find minimum residual capacity of the edges along the
            # path filled by BFS. Or we can say find the maximum flow
            # through the path found.
            path_flow = float("Inf")
            s = sink
            while s != source:
                path_flow = min(path_flow, self.graph[parent[s]][s])
                s = parent[s]

            # Add path flow to overall flow
            max_flow += path_flow

            # update residual capacities of the edges and reverse edges
            # along the path
            v = sink
            while v != source:
                u = parent[v]
                self.graph[u][v] -= path_flow
                self.graph[v][u] += path_flow
                v = parent[v]

        return max_flow

See also 

 Berge's theorem
 Approximate max-flow min-cut theorem
 Turn restriction routing
 Dinic's algorithm

Notes

References

External links
 A tutorial explaining the Ford–Fulkerson method to solve the max-flow problem
 Another Java animation
 Java Web Start application

Network flow problem
Articles with example pseudocode
Graph algorithms
Articles with example Python (programming language) code